The 2002 San Jose mayoral election was held on March 5, 2002 to elect the mayor of San Jose, California. It saw the reelection of Ron Gonzales.

Because Gonzales won an outright majority in the initial round of the election, no runoff election needed to be held.

Results

References

San Jose
San Jose
2002